Eclipse Monthly was a full color comics anthology title published in 1983–1984 by Eclipse Comics. An attempt by Eclipse to revive the comics anthologies of the Golden Age of Comic Books, Eclipse Monthly was the successor to Eclipse's black-and-white anthology Eclipse, the Magazine, which was published from May 1981 to January 1983. Eclipse Monthly  featured many characters — including Steve Ditko's Static and B. C. Boyer's The Masked Man — that had been part of Eclipse, the Magazine and were later featured in their own series or collections.

Features
Capt. Quick and A Foozle by Marshall Rogers
Rio by Doug Wildey
Static by Steve Ditko
The Masked Man by B. C. Boyer
Dope by Sax Rohmer and Trina Robbins
Ragamuffins by Don McGregor and Gene Colan

Issues
 (August 1983) Feat. Capt. Quick and A Foozle, Masked Man, Rio, Dope, Static
 (September 1983) Feat. Capt. Quick and A Foozle, Masked Man, Rio, Dope, Static
 (October 1983) Feat. Capt. Quick and A Foozle, Masked Man, Ragamuffins, Dope, Static 
 (January 1984) Feat. Capt. Quick and A Foozle, Ragamuffins, Masked Man
 (February 1984) Feat. Rio, The Masked Man
 (March 1984) Feat. Carlos McLlyr, The Californio; Nightingale; Masked Man
 (April 1984) Feat. Carlos McLlyr, The Californio; Nightingale; Masked Man
 (May 1984) Feat. Carlos McLlyr, The Californio; Dirty Pool; Masked Man
 (June 1984) Feat.  Steel, Stealth & Magic; Rio; Masked Man
 (July 1984) Feat. Jetta, Rio, Masked Man

References

1983 comics debuts
1984 comics endings
Comics anthologies
Comics by Don McGregor
Defunct American comics